Quercus laceyi, the Lacey oak, is a small to medium-size deciduous oak tree which is native to northeastern Mexico (Coahuila and Nuevo León) and to the Texas Hill Country in central Texas in the United States.

Description
Its blue-green leaves are oblong and shallowly lobed to unlobed, but shade leaves can be deeply lobed; they most often turn yellow or brown in autumn.

Quercus laceyi has often been confused with Quercus glaucoides, which is an evergreen oak native to central and southern Mexico.

Habitat
Quercus laceyi is often found in association with limestone outcrops.

References

External links
 Texas Superstar®, by Texas A&M University, "Lacey Oak Is A Real Texas Lady"
 photo of herbarium specimen collected in Nuevo León in 1996

laceyi
Trees of Northeastern Mexico
Trees of the South-Central United States
Flora of Texas
Taxa named by John Kunkel Small
Oaks of Mexico